Arctesthes catapyrrha is a moth of the family Geometridae. It is endemic to New Zealand.

Taxonomy

This species was first described by Arthur Gardiner Butler in 1877 using specimens collected by James Hector and J. D. Enys and named Fidonia catapyrrha. In 1884 Edward Meyrick placed this species in the newly described genus Stratonice. In 1885 Meyrick replaced this preoccupied name with Arctesthes. However also in 1885 Meyrick synonymised Arctesthes catapyrrha with Coremia euclidiata (now known as Chrysolarentia euclidiata). In 1898 George Hudson discussed and illustrated this species under the name Lythria euclidiata, following this error made by Meyrick. In 1912 George Blundell Longstaff corrected Meyrick's error. In 1917 Meyrick agreed with that correction. In 1928 Hudson again discussed and illustrated this species but this time, again following Meyrick, under the name Lythria catapyrrha. Robin C. Craw in 1986 reinstated the genus Arctesthes and placed this species within it. In 1988 J. S. Dugdale confirmed this placement and while doing so synonymised two forms, fasciata and kaikourensis, that had been previously named by Louis Beethoven Prout, into this species. In 2019 Brian and Hamish Patrick as well as Robert Hoare reviewed the genus Arctesthes and again confirmed this species placement within it. The male holotype specimen, collected at Castle Hill in Canterbury, is held at the Natural History Museum, London.

Description 
Butler described this species as follows:
Dugdale mentions that the male holotype specimen collected in Canterbury has the typical colouration for that area of hindwings strongly coloured with red below. Specimens in Otago have less red colouration and the discal strip is not red.

Distribution
This species is endemic to New Zealand. A. catapyrrha is widespread and is found in open areas from coastal to alpine locations. It prefers stony habitat such as shingle riverbeds and stony fields. It has been observed in the Mackenzie Country, Kaitorete Spit, near the Waimakariri River, and in Central Otago.

Life stages
 
A. catapyrrha is a day flying moth.  Adult moths can be seen between October and March.

Host species

Larvae of A. catapyrrha feed on a wide range of low herbs including Plantago species and on Raoulia australis. The adults of this moth are known to pollinate Raoulia subsericea.

References

External links

 Specimens held at the Auckland War Memorial Museum
 Image of specimen held at Te Papa Tongarewa Museum of New Zealand

Moths of New Zealand
Larentiinae
Moths described in 1877
Endemic fauna of New Zealand
Endemic moths of New Zealand